Kozarevići is a village in Bosnia and Herzegovina. According to the 1991 census, the village is located in the municipality of Istočno Novo Sarajevo.

References

Populated places in Istočno Novo Sarajevo
Villages in Republika Srpska